Valldalsvatnet is a lake in Ullensvang Municipality in Vestland county, Norway. The lake has a dam at the southern end, and it is used to regulate the water level for purposes of hydroelectric power generation. This lake and the neighboring lakes of Votna and Røldalsvatnet are all regulated together as part of the Røldal-Suldal watershed which feeds a nearby hydroelectric power station.

See also
List of lakes in Norway

References

Lakes of Vestland
Ullensvang
Reservoirs in Norway